Mihai Bîrzu (26 May 1955 – 1998) was a Romanian archer. He competed in the men's individual event at the 1980 Summer Olympics.

References

1955 births
1998 deaths
Romanian male archers
Olympic archers of Romania
Archers at the 1980 Summer Olympics
Place of birth missing